1951 Országos Bajnokság I (men's water polo) was the 45th water polo championship in Hungary. There were ten teams who played two-round match for the title.

Final list 

* M: Matches W: Win D: Drawn L: Lost G+: Goals earned G-: Goals got P: Point

2. Class 
Qualification-Relegation play-offs: 1. Bp. Vörös Meteor 9, 2. Tatabányai Bányász 8, 3. Vasas Csepel Autó 6, 4. Szegedi Petőfi 5, 5. Tolnai Vörös Lobogó 2, 6. Miskolci Bástya 0 point.

Budapest: 1. Bp. Vörös Meteor 23, 2. Vasas MÁVAG 13, 3. Előre MÁVAUT 12, 4. Bp. Vörös Lobogó 11 (2), 5. Szikra Tipográfia 8 (2), 6. Bp. Haladás 8 (2), 7. Gyárépítés 1 point (2). In parentheses number of matches is missed.

Sources 
Gyarmati Dezső: Aranykor (Hérodotosz Könyvkiadó és Értékesítő Bt., Budapest, 2002.)

1951 in water polo
1951 in Hungarian sport
Seasons in Hungarian water polo competitions